Solange Damasceno Santana (Ilhéus, February 2, 1953) is a Brazilian reporter, actress and comedian.

Career 
Solange became known nationally in 2004, after participating in a radio program in Ilhéus. In the program, she complained about the problems in her city, and Solange's arguments and stuttering drew attention. The video ended up on You Tube and Solange became an instant celebrity at the time, which made her participate in several television programs and be part of the cast of extinct Show do Tom, on RecordTV.

Has a stutter sister named Cremilda Santana, who has already participated with her in programs such as As Gagas de Ilhéus. They were successful in the program Pânico na Band from 2015 to 2017, with the paintings As Gagas de Ilhéus, Desempregagas and Largagas e Peladas.

Filmography

Television

References 

1961 births
Brazilian television actresses
Brazilian comedians
Living people
21st-century Brazilian actresses
People from Ilhéus